The following are the national records in athletics in Panama maintained by its national athletics federation: Federación Panameña de Atletismo (FEPAT).

Outdoor

Key to tables:

+ = en route to a longer distance

h = hand timing

A = affected by altitude

NWI = no wind information

OT = oversized track (> 200m in circumference)

Men

Women

Indoor

Men

Women

References

External links
 FEPAT web site 

Panama
Records
Athletics
Athletics